Harold "Buckley" Belanger (born March 21, 1960) is a Canadian provincial politician, who served as the Member of the Legislative Assembly of Saskatchewan for the constituency of Athabasca, in the north-western corner of the province. He is a member of the provincial New Democratic Party and the federal Liberal Party of Canada.

Career 
He was originally elected to the Legislative Assembly in the 1995 general election as a Liberal member. He left the party to join the NDP in 1998, recontesting his seat in a by-election in which he attained 93.64 per cent of the vote, the second highest margin of victory ever attained by an electoral candidate in the province. Belanger has been re-elected in every election since then, most recently in the 2020 general election, in which he was re-elected with a majority of 618.

Prior to his election to the legislature, Belanger served as mayor of Île-à-la-Crosse, and worked as a journalist and administrator for MBC Radio. On August 15, 2021 he resigned from the legislature to run in the 2021 Canadian federal election, as a federal Liberal in the riding of Desnethé—Missinippi—Churchill River. He was defeated.

Electoral history

2020 Saskatchewan general election

2016 Saskatchewan general election

2011 Saskatchewan general election

2007 Saskatchewan general election

2003 Saskatchewan general election

1999 Saskatchewan general election

1998 Athabasca by-election

1995 Saskatchewan general election

References

External links
 Buckley Belanger - Saskatchewan New Democrat caucus website

1960 births
Living people
Saskatchewan New Democratic Party MLAs
Saskatchewan Liberal Party MLAs
Métis politicians
Canadian radio journalists
Journalists from Saskatchewan
Liberal Party of Canada candidates for the Canadian House of Commons
Mayors of places in Saskatchewan
Members of the Executive Council of Saskatchewan
Canadian Métis people
21st-century Canadian politicians